Lou Gargiulo is an American real estate businessman from Hampton Falls, New Hampshire, who spent two terms (1992–1996) as a Republican member of the New Hampshire House of Representatives. He was the Republican nominee for the 24th Senate district in 2020, losing to incumbent Tom Sherman by 4.7 points.

Special election 
In 2011, when fellow Republican Gary Wheaton resigned his position representing the Rockingham County 14th House District after multiple arrests, Gargiulo ran in the special election to fill Wheaton's seat. Gargiulo was endorsed by Republican heavyweights such as ex-Governor John H. Sununu, state senator Nancy Stiles, Congressman Frank Guinta, and the New England Right to Work Campaign (among others), but lost in the five-way (Wheaton himself ran for the nomination but received only sixteen votes) Republican primary, which was won by union firefighter and paramedic Kevin Janvrin of Seabrook.

References

External links 
Gargiulo's campaign website

Living people
Republican Party members of the New Hampshire House of Representatives
People from Hampton Falls, New Hampshire
American real estate businesspeople
Year of birth missing (living people)